The Chiputneticook Lakes are a group of several lakes along the international boundary between Maine and New Brunswick.

They are East Grand Lake, North Lake, Mud Lake, Spednic Lake, and Palfrey Lake.

This lake system forms the head waters of the St. Croix River which the International Boundary follows to Passamaquoddy Bay.

Chiputneticook comes from the Passamaquody Chiputneticook, "great fork river", a possible reference to the St. Croix River.

See also
List of lakes of New Brunswick
 Forest City, New Brunswick
 Forest City, Maine

External links
 Chiputneticook Lakes International Conservancy an advocacy organization focused on these lakes

References

Lake groups of the United States
Lakes of Aroostook County, Maine
Lakes of Washington County, Maine
Lakes of New Brunswick
Landforms of York County, New Brunswick
Canada–United States border
International lakes of North America
Lakes of Maine